Emmanuel Clément (born October 15, 1971 in Colmar, France) is a former professional footballer. He played as a midfielder with Zidane In french junior national team.

External links
Emmanuel Clément profile at chamoisfc79.fr

1971 births
Living people
French footballers
Association football defenders
FC Metz players
Amiens SC players
Chamois Niortais F.C. players
Stade de Reims players
US Boulogne players
Ligue 1 players
Calais RUFC players
Ligue 2 players
OFC Charleville players